Desjardins may refer to:

 Desjardins (surname), people with the surname Desjardins
 Desjardins, Lévis, Quebec, Canada, a borough of the city of Lévis
 Desjardins Regional County Municipality, a regional county municipality which preceded the borough
 Desjardins Canal, in Ontario
 Desjardins Group, a Canadian association of credit unions
 Desjardins Credit Union, a Canadian credit union whose creation was funded by the Desjardins Group
 Délémontez-Desjardins D.01, a French ultralight monoplane

See also 
 Dejardin (disambiguation)
 Desjardin (disambiguation)